The Great Central and Midland Joint Railway, formerly, before 1897, Sheffield and Midland Railway Companies' Committee, was a collection of joint railways, mainly in the Manchester and South Yorkshire areas.

Description of route
In the South Yorkshire area most of the lines were colliery branches, where the companies joined forces to tap the coal measures and gain a foothold in the lucrative traffic. The main line within South Yorkshire was in two sections: 

1.

2. Leaving the G.C., H&B and M.R. Joint at Braithwell a line to both the Midland and former M.S.& L.R. lines in the Kilnhurst and Parkgate (Roundwood) area, much of this originally being built by the colliery company and being known locally, from 1910, as John Brown's Private Railway, linking their Silverwood Colliery to the staithes on the River Don and to Roundwood Colliery. This was incorporated into the Rotherham, Maltby and Laughton Railway, which became a constituent of the G.C. & M. Joint.

Also included in the joint committee were short curves linking the partners lines.

In Manchester, most of these lines were on the eastern side of the city:

1. From Ashburys Junction, on the Woodhead Line, to New Mills where a branch line took the Great Central to Hayfield whilst the main section went to New Mills South Junction and joined the Midland line to Derby or Sheffield, via Chinley.

2. From the Woodhead line at Hyde Junction to Romiley Junction, an alternative line (and diversion) from above.

At grouping these lines became joint L.N.E.R./L.M.S.R. property.

References

Pre-grouping British railway companies
Rail transport in South Yorkshire
Great Central Railway
Midland Railway
Railway companies established in 1897